Artistic and Monumental Spain  (Spanish: España Artística y Monumental) is an illustrated travel book in 3 volumes, including significant structures and monuments in Spain. It was published in 1842 in Paris by Veith and Hauser. The illustrator  was Jenaro Pérez Villaamil in collaboration with Patricio de la Escosura, who was responsible for the text. His patron or sponsor was the Gaspar Remisa.

History
The work was created by a collaboration of writer Patricio de la Escosura, with lithographer Louis-Julien Jacottet (1806–1880), and the artist Jenaro Pérez Villaamil who also acted as editor.

Illustrated travel books of this type became popular during Romantic movement of the 19th century. España Artística y Monumental was one of the most beautiful works in  this genre works along España pintoresca y artística (Francisco de Paula Van Halen) and Recuerdos y bellezas de España (Francisco Javier Parcerisa with José María Quadrado).

Most of the illustrated plates were done by Villaamil, many of them drawn from his own paintings; in these cases the illustration included his  signature at the bottom  «<GP de Villaamil pinxit>». Other artists also contributed including his brother Juan, Valentín Carderera, José Domínguez Bécquer, and Cecilio Pizarro.

Some parts of the work was created from original drawings purchased from other artists. In some cases the  author's name is recorded on the illustration, else it is simply reads  «G. Pérez de Villaamil lo dirigió». This happened to Valentin Cardedera's illustration causing him to write a letter of complaint to Villaamil:

Description
The whole work has a romantic tinge in line with contemporary European works. The illustrations echoed Pérez Villamil's style  which celebrated a romantic medieval aspect. The Paris publishing house Hauser published the work between 1842 and 1850 in three volumes - around twenty French and one Spanish lithographer worked on the plates. Despite the variety of authors and lithographers whole had a consistent style thanks to the good direction Pérez Villamil with the lithographers allowed to  used interpretive licenses when working from the originals..

The work contains 44 views of Toledo, 19 of Burgos, as well as illustrations of various places of Castile, Aragon, Andalusia, the Basque Country, Navarre, and Galicia. The choice was arbitrary and did not represent all regions of Spain.

Notes

References

External links

  , at Biblioteca Digital de Castilla y León
  , at Biblioteca Virtual del Patrimonio Bibliográfico
  , at Dipòsit Digital de Documents de la UAB

Books about Spain
Travel books
Architecture in Spain